At the 1948 Summer Olympics in London, 33 athletics events were contested, 24 for men and 9 for women. Three events made their Olympic debut at these Games: women's 200 metres, women's long jump and women's shot put. There were a total number of 745 participating athletes from 53 countries.

Medal summary

Men

Women

Records broken
14 new Olympic records were set in the athletics events. No new world records were set.

Men's Olympic records

Women's Olympic records

References
1948 Summer Olympics results: athletics, from https://www.sports-reference.com/; retrieved 2010-06-01.
International Olympic Committee results database
Athletics Australia

 
1948 Summer Olympics events
O
1948
International athletics competitions hosted by England
Athletics in London